The New England Australian Football League was an Australian rules football league based around the University of New England in Armidale, Australia.  It was created by UNE students in 1962 and ran until 1984, when its remaining clubs moved to the North West AFL.

One former NEAFL club, the New England Nomads, still plays today in the Tamworth AFL.  The Coffs Harbour Swans also played in the NEAFL before creating their own local competition, the North Coast AFL.

History
From 1962 until the mid-1970s, the league was essentially an internal competition run by and for the students of the University of New England.  Four teams representing the student houses at the university competed.  In 1975, a club was formed in Tamworth.  The following seasons saw the creation of further clubs in Gunnedah, Wee Waa and Coonabarabran.  The non-Armidale based clubs soon broke away to form their own league, the North West AFL.

A new club known as the Wanderers formed in the nearby town of Uralla in the 1970s, although they folded by the early 1980s.

A club from Coffs Harbour formed for the 1979 league, and won the NEAFL premiership in 1980. They formed a second team for the 1981 season, giving Coffs two teams, Norths and Souths. A team from further down the coast, at Port Macquarie also joined the competition. These three clubs and Port form the North Coast AFL in 1982 with new clubs from Grafton, Woolgoolga and Urunga.

Having seeded two new regional league over the preceding decade, the NEAFL folded after the 1984 season, its clubs moving to the North West AFL.  The NWAFL in turn disbanded in 1993, seeing Aussie Rules revert to being an intramural sport at the university until the formation of the Tamworth AFL in 1997.

References

Australian rules football in Australia
New England (New South Wales)
Defunct Australian rules football competitions in New South Wales
Sports leagues established in 1962
1962 establishments in Australia
1984 disestablishments in Australia